Oliver Langford is an English referee             and officiates primarily in the EFL Championship. He is not in the Select Group of match officials but is, however, on the Group Two list and trained in the use of Video Assisted Refereeing, which means he is qualified to take charge of an elite league match. He has been a referee since 2009.

He made his Premier League debut on 18 August 2019, when he was scheduled to be the fourth official in Chelsea's home match against Leicester, after Match Official Graham Scott was stuck in Traffic on the M40. Although Scott arrived at the ground, he missed the warm-up, meaning that he had to be replaced by Langford. The match finished in a 1–1 draw.

References

External links
 
 
 

Living people
Premier League referees
Year of birth missing (living people)
English football referees